On 22 July 2019, at least 18 people were killed after a car bomb exploded on the road of Aden Adde International Airport and near the Afrin Hotel in Mogadishu, Somalia. Dozens others were injured, 17 critically. Al-Shabaab claimed responsibility for the attack.

Attack 
On 22 July 2019, a vehicle laden with explosives detonated at a checkpoint on the same road as the city's airport, killing 17 and injuring 28 others including some who were in critical condition. Witnessed stated that the explosion knocked them off their feet and damaged many buildings.

Reaction 
This attack and the attack two days later that killed the Mayor of Mogadishu and six others shocked and were strongly condemned by many countries.

References 

2010s in Mogadishu
2019 in Somalia
2019 murders in Somalia
2019 road incidents
22 July 2019 bombing
2010s road incidents in Africa
21st-century mass murder in Somalia 
22 July 2019 bombing
Islamic terrorist incidents in 2019
July 2019 crimes in Africa
Mass murder in 2019
22 July 2019 bombing
Road incidents in Somalia
Suicide bombings in 2019
22 July 2019
Suicide car and truck bombings in Somalia 
Terrorist incidents in Somalia in 2019
Somali Civil War (2009–present)
2019 disasters in Somalia